Colonel Guy Robert Crouch (1890 – 1956) was a British philatelist who was added to the Roll of Distinguished Philatelists in 1955.

References

Signatories to the Roll of Distinguished Philatelists
1890 births
1956 deaths
British philatelists